Joseph William Kiefer [Harlem Joe or Smoke] (July 19, 1899 – July 5, 1975) was a pitcher in Major League Baseball who played for the Chicago White Sox and Boston Red Sox. He was born in West Leyden, New York.

In a three-season career, Kiefer posted a 0–5 record with a 6.16 ERA in 15 appearances, including four starts, nine strikeouts, and 49⅔ innings of work. He also pitched in the minors for 21 years and served in the U.S. Army during World War I.

Kiefer died in Utica, New York at age 75.

References

External links
Baseball Reference

1899 births
1975 deaths
Major League Baseball pitchers
Chicago White Sox players
Boston Red Sox players
Baseball players from New York (state)
United States Army personnel of World War I
Atlanta Crackers players
Bay City Wolves players
Charleston Pals players
Galveston Sand Crabs players
Hazleton Mountaineers players
Jersey City Skeeters players
Milwaukee Brewers (minor league) players
Muskegon Muskies players
Reading Red Sox players
Rome Colonels players
Scranton Miners players
Wichita Falls Spudders players
Wilkes-Barre Barons (baseball) players
Williamsport Grays players